This is a list of Harlequin Romance novels released in 1994.

Releases

References 

Romance novels
Lists of novels
1994 novels